Bernard Renault may refer to:
 Bernard Renault (canoeist)
 Bernard Renault (botanist)
 Bernard Renault (Twin Peaks)